Live at the Continental is a 1995 live album by Australian musician Chris Wilson. The album was released in September 1994. At the ARIA Music Awards of 1995, the album was nominated for Best Male Artist.

The album was re-released in January 2021 and on vinyl for the first time, where it peaked at number 19 on the ARIA charts.

Track listings

2021 release

Charts

Weekly charts

Year-end charts

Release history

References

1995 albums
Live albums by Australian artists
Mushroom Records albums